Karpinsk is a town in Sverdlovsk Oblast, Russia, located on the Turya River (Ob's basin),  north of Yekaterinburg, the administrative center of the oblast. Population:  The town is named for mineralogist and geologist Alexander Karpinsky.

History
The settlement of Bogoslovsk was founded in either 1759 or in 1769. It remained one of the largest copper production centers in the Urals until 1917. Coal deposits started to be mined in 1911. In 1941, the settlement of Bogoslovsky merged with the nearby settlement of Ugolny to form the town of Karpinsk.

From 1945 to 1949, there existed close to Karpinsk a labor camp for Russo-Germans and German civilians, who for the most part were forcibly displaced from East Prussia and Pomerania to be used as forced labor. They were women and men between fifteen and sixty-five years of age. Those capable of work were forced to engage in strip-mining of lignite, used in housing construction and road construction, labored in a stone quarry, and at times served as skilled laborers in various workshops. Seasonally, work brigades were sent into the taiga as forest laborers. Moreover, prisoner-of-war camp #504 for German POWs from World War II was located in Karpinsk.

Administrative and municipal status
Within the framework of the administrative divisions, it is, together with the town of Volchansk and ten rural localities, incorporated as the Town of Karpinsk—an administrative unit with the status equal to that of the districts. As a municipal division, Karpinsk and eight rural localities are incorporated as Karpinsk Urban Okrug. The town of Volchansk, together with the remaining two rural localities, is incorporated separately as Volchansky Urban Okrug.

Sports

Mikhail Sveshnikov, who is considered to be one of the best bandy players in the world, comes from the town. After the 2011-2012 season, he was acknowledged as the second best player of the national championship. He has become a citizen of honour in Karpinsk.

The local bandy club is Sputnik, where Oleg Sveshnikov, the father of Mikhail, is a coach.

See also
Volchansk tram system (defunct interurban line to Karpinsk)

References

Notes

Sources

External links

Official website of Karpinsk 
Karpinsk Business Directory  

Cities and towns in Sverdlovsk Oblast
Verkhotursky Uyezd
Monotowns in Russia